Conniver (1944–1970) was an American Thoroughbred racehorse who was voted the 1948 American Champion Older Female Horse. Bred by Alfred G. Vanderbilt II, she was purchase as a yearling by New York City businessman and sculptor, Harry La Montagne.

When her racing days were over, Conniver was used as a broodmare. Of her six foals, Clandestine and Plotter won important American Graded stakes races.

References
 Conniver's pedigree and partial racing stats

1944 racehorse births
1970 racehorse deaths
Racehorses bred in Maryland
Racehorses trained in the United States
American Champion racehorses
Thoroughbred family 18